Lorraine Quarberg (born February 10, 1952) is an American politician who served in the Wyoming House of Representatives from the 28th district from 2005 to 2011.

References

1952 births
Living people
Republican Party members of the Wyoming House of Representatives